Bhikhiwind is a town and a nagar panchayat, just about 33 km from Tarn Taran Sahib in Tarn Taran district  in the Majha region of state of Punjab, India. The town is located along the India-Pakistan border in Tarn Taran district of Punjab, India, 280 km from Chandigarh.

Geography

Demographics
 Census of India, Bhikhiwind had a population of 10,269. Males constitute 53% of the population and females 47%. Bhikhiwind has an average literacy rate of 66%, higher than the national average of 59.5%; with the male literacy rate of 71% and female literacy rate of 60%. 14% of the population is under 6 years of age.

References

Cities and towns in Tarn Taran district